Saint Christopher was an early Christian martyr.

Saint Christopher or St Christopher may also refer to:

 Saint Christopher of Trebizond, a seventh century saint venerated in Eastern Orthodoxy
 Saint Christopher island or Saint Kitts, an island in the Leeward Islands
 Saint Christopher (after van Eyck), a lost 15th-century painting by Jan van Eyck
 Saint Christopher (novel), a 1912 posthumous novel by José Maria de Eça de Queirós
 Saint Christopher (yacht), New Zealand's largest flagged private yacht
 HMS St Christopher, a ship and a shore establishment of the Royal Navy
 St. Christopher (band), a British pop band
 St. Christopher Island, and island in the Biscoe Islands of Antarctica